"I Do" is the second single from British R&B artist Jamelia. "I Do" was the first single from her debut album Drama and was her first UK top 40 hit, peaking at #36 on the UK Singles Chart.  The Spanish Mix has Slum Village rapping on it as well as a UK rapper named Dubwise (Junior Williams). The track was originally remixed with only Dubwise rapping. Although Dubwise's rap was great, he was largely unknown. So it was suggested that an American rap group may help to further the success of the single. So Slum Village was chosen to rap on it. After they heard Dubwise's rap, they suggested that at least one of his verses should remain, in respect of his efforts. Dubwise's verse appears in between two members of Slum Village's raps, near the end of the track and begins with "now if you really wanna score.........."

Track listing
 "I Do" (radio mix)
 "I Do" (Raw Soul remix)
 "I Do" (Capital T mix - single edit)
 "I Do" (Rugged Tuff mix)
 "I Do" (Spanish mix) (featuring Slum Village)
 "I Do" (Enhanced section - including video and photographs)

Charts

1999 singles
Jamelia songs
Songs written by Jamelia
1999 songs
Parlophone singles
Songs written by Colin Emmanuel
Songs written by Daniel de Bourg